Vaisheshika or Vaiśeṣika is one of the six schools of Indian philosophy from ancient India. In its early stages, the Vaiśeṣika was an independent philosophy with its own metaphysics, epistemology, logic, ethics, and soteriology. Over time, the Vaiśeṣika system became similar in its philosophical procedures, ethical conclusions and soteriology to the Nyāya school of Hinduism, but retained its difference in epistemology and metaphysics.

The epistemology of the Vaiśeṣika school of Hinduism, like Buddhism, accepted only two reliable means to knowledge: direct observation and inference. the Vaiśeṣika school and Buddhism both consider their respective scriptures as indisputable and valid means to knowledge, the difference being that the scriptures held to be a valid and reliable source by Vaiśeṣikas were the Vedas.

The Vaisheshika school is known for its insights in naturalism.  It is a form of atomism in natural philosophy. It postulated that all objects in the physical universe are reducible to paramāṇu (atoms), and one's experiences are derived from the interplay of substance (a function of atoms, their number and their spatial arrangements), quality, activity, commonness, particularity and inherence. Everything was composed of atoms, qualities emerged from aggregates of atoms, but the aggregation and nature of these atoms was predetermined by cosmic forces. Ajivika metaphysics included a theory of atoms which was later adapted in the Vaiśeṣika  school.

According to the Vaiśeṣika school, knowledge and liberation were achievable by a complete understanding of the world of experience.

Vaiśeṣika darshana was founded by Kaṇāda Kashyapa around the 6th to 2nd century BC.

Overview
Although the Vaisheshika system developed independently from the Nyaya school of Hinduism, the two became similar and are often studied together. In its classical form, however, the Vaishesika school differed from the Nyaya in one crucial respect: where Nyaya accepted four sources of valid knowledge, the Vaishesika accepted only two.

The epistemology of Vaiśeṣika school of Hinduism accepted only two reliable means to knowledge – perception and inference.

Vaisheshika espouses a form of atomism, that the reality is composed of five substances (examples are earth, water, air, fire, and space). Each of these five are of two types, explains Ganeri: paramāṇu and composite. A paramāṇu is that which is indestructible, indivisible, and has a special kind of dimension, called “small” (aṇu). A composite is that which is divisible into paramāṇu. Whatever human beings perceive is composite, and even the smallest perceptible thing, namely, a fleck of dust, has parts, which are therefore invisible. The Vaiśeṣikas visualized the smallest composite thing as a “triad” (tryaṇuka) with three parts, each part with a “dyad” (dyaṇuka). Vaiśeṣikas believed that a dyad has two parts, each of which is an atom. Size, form, truths and everything that human beings experience as a whole is a function of parmanus, their number and their spatial arrangements.

Parama means "most distant, remotest, extreme, last" and aṇu means "atom, very small particle", hence paramāṇu is essentially "the most distant or last small (i.e. smallest) particle".

Vaisheshika postulated that what one experiences is derived from dravya (substance: a function of atoms, their number and their spatial arrangements), guna (quality), karma (activity), samanya (commonness), vishesha (particularity) and samavaya (inherence, inseparable connectedness of everything).

The followers of this philosophy are mostly Shaivas. Acharya Haribhadra Suri, in his work 'Ṣaḍdarśanasamuccaya' describes the followers of Vaiśeṣika as worshippers of Pashupati or Shiva.

Epistemology
Hinduism identifies six Pramāṇas as epistemically reliable means to accurate knowledge and to truths: Pratyakṣa (perception), Anumāna (inference), Śabda or āgama "(word, testimony of past or present reliable experts), Upamāna (comparison and analogy), Arthāpatti (postulation, derivation from circumstances), and Anupalabdhi (non-perception, negative/cognitive proof). Yoga, accepts the first three of these six as pramāṇa; and, the Nyaya school, related to Vaiśeṣika, accepts the first four out of these six.
Pratyakṣa (प्रत्यक्ष) means perception. It is of two types: external and internal. External perception is described as that arising from the interaction of five senses and worldly objects, while internal perception is described by this school as that of inner sense, the mind. The ancient and medieval texts of Hinduism identify four requirements for correct perception: Indriyarthasannikarsa (direct experience by one's sensory organ(s) with the object, whatever is being studied), Avyapadesya (non-verbal; correct perception is not through hearsay, according to ancient Indian scholars, where one's sensory organ relies on accepting or rejecting someone else's perception), Avyabhicara (does not wander; correct perception does not change, nor is it the result of deception because one's sensory organ or means of observation is drifting, defective, suspect) and Vyavasayatmaka (definite; correct perception excludes judgments of doubt, either because of one's failure to observe all the details, or because one is mixing inference with observation and observing what one wants to observe, or not observing what one does not want to observe). Some ancient scholars proposed "unusual perception" as pramāṇa and called it internal perception, a proposal contested by other Indian scholars. The internal perception concepts included pratibha (intuition), samanyalaksanapratyaksa (a form of induction from perceived specifics to a universal), and jnanalaksanapratyaksa (a form of perception of prior processes and previous states of a 'topic of study' by observing its current state). Further, the texts considered and refined rules of accepting uncertain knowledge from Pratyakṣa-pranama, so as to contrast nirnaya (definite judgment, conclusion) from anadhyavasaya (indefinite judgment).
Anumāna (अनुमान) means inference. It is described as reaching a new conclusion and truth from one or more observations and previous truths by applying reason. Observing smoke and inferring fire is an example of Anumana. In all except one Hindu philosophies, this is a valid and useful means to knowledge. The method of inference is explained by Indian texts as consisting of three parts: pratijna (hypothesis), hetu (a reason), and drshtanta (examples). The hypothesis must further be broken down into two parts, state the ancient Indian scholars: sadhya (that idea which needs to proven or disproven) and paksha (the object on which the sadhya is predicated). The inference is conditionally true if sapaksha (positive examples as evidence) are present, and if vipaksha (negative examples as counter-evidence) are absent. For rigor, the Indian philosophies also state further epistemic steps. For example, they demand Vyapti - the requirement that the hetu (reason) must necessarily and separately account for the inference in "all" cases, in both sapaksha and vipaksha. A conditionally proven hypothesis is called a nigamana (conclusion).

Syllogism

Literature
This treatise is divided into ten books. The next Vaisheshika treatise, Candra’s  (648) based on ’s treatise is available only in Chinese translation. The earliest commentary available on ’s treatise is ’s  (8th century).

The Categories or Padārtha
According to the Vaisheshika school, all things that exist, that can be cognized and named are s (literal meaning: the meaning of a word), the objects of experience. Later s ( and Udayana and ) added one more category abhava (non-existence). The first three categories are defined as artha (which can perceived) and they have real objective existence.

Dravya (substance): The substances are conceived as 9 in number. They are,  (earth), ap (water), tejas (fire),  (air),   (ether),   (time), dik (space),  (self or soul) and manas (mind). The first five are called s, the substances having some specific qualities so that they could be perceived by one or the other external senses.
 Guṇa (quality): The  mentions 17 s (qualities), to which  added another 7. The original 17 s (qualities) are,  (colour), rasa (taste), gandha (smell),  (touch),  (number),    (size/dimension/quantity),  (individuality),  (conjunction/accompaniments),  (disjunction),  (priority), aparatva (posteriority), buddhi (knowledge), sukha (pleasure),  (pain),  (desire),   (aversion) and prayatna (effort).
 Karma (activity): The karmas (activities) like s (qualities) have no separate existence, they belong to the substances. But while a quality is a permanent feature of a substance, an activity is a transient one.
 Sāmānya (generality): Since there are plurality of substances, there will be relations among them. When a property is found common to many substances, it is called .
As the ultimate atoms are innumerable so are the s.
  (inherence):   defined  as the relation between the cause and the effect.    defined it as the relationship existing between the substances that are inseparable, standing to one another in the relation of the container and the contained.

The atomic theory
The s (atoms) are indivisible and eternal, they can neither be created nor destroyed. Each  (atom) possesses its own distinct  (individuality) and have an inhering relation which is responsible for change and motion.

The measure of the partless atoms is known as parimaṇḍala parimāṇa. It is eternal and it cannot generate the measure of any other substance. Its measure is its own absolutely.

See also
Darshanas
Hindu philosophy
Hinduism
Nyaya (philosophy)
Padārtha
Tarka-Sangraha
Vaiśeṣika Sūtra
Atomism

Notes

References
.
.

.

Further reading
 Bimal Matilal (1977), A History of Indian Literature - Nyāya-Vaiśeṣika, Otto Harrassowitz Verlag, 
 Gopi Kaviraj (1961), Gleanings from the history and bibliography of the Nyaya-Vaisesika literature, Indian Studies: Past & Present, Volume 2, Number 4, 

Kak, Subhash: Matter and Mind: The Vaiśeṣika Sūtra of Kaṇāda

External links
Vaisheshika-sutra with three commentaries English translation by Nandalal Sinha, 1923 (includes glossary)
A summary of Vaisheshika physics
 Shastra Nethralaya - Vaisheshika 
 GRETIL e-text of the Vaiśeṣika Sūtras

Ancient Indian philosophy
Āstika
Atomism
Epistemology
Hindu philosophy
Logic
Metaphysics of religion